Prionopaltis subdentalis is a moth in the family Crambidae. It was described by Charles Swinhoe in 1894. It is found in Meghalaya, India.

The wings are uniform greyish olive, with a brown mark at the end of each cell. The forewings have a small brown spot within the cell. The exterior line starts with two white lunular marks at the costa. It is continued across the hindwings. The marginal points are black.

References

Spilomelinae
Moths described in 1894